Sarab (also Romanized as Sarāb; also known as Sūrab) is a village in Afriz Rural District, Sedeh District, Qaen County, South Khorasan Province, Iran. At the 2006 census, its population was 185, in 46 families.

References 

Populated places in Qaen County